Akıncılar is a town and a district of Sivas Province, Turkey.

Akıncılar may also refer to the following places in Turkey:

 Akıncılar, Bartın, a village in the District of Bartın, Bartın Province
 Akıncılar, İnegöl, Bursa Province
 Akıncılar, Kahta, a village in the District of Kahta, Adıyaman Province
 Akıncılar, Tavas, Denizli Province
 Akıncılar, Yeniçağa, Bolu Province
 Louroujina, a village in Northern Cyprus, named "Akıncılar" in Turkish